Into the White (also known as  Comrade, Lost in the Snow and Cross of Honour in the United Kingdom) is a 2012 film set during the Second World War and directed by Petter Næss. It is inspired by and loosely based on real-life events that occurred in Norway during the war.

Into the White was written by Ole Meldgaard, Dave Mango and Petter Næss and directed by Næss. The film stars David Kross, Stig Henrik Hoff, Florian Lukas, Rupert Grint and Lachlan Nieboer.

Plot
On 27 April 1940, a Luftwaffe Heinkel He 111 bomber (1H+CT) is pursued near Grotli by a Fleet Air Arm Blackburn Skua (L2940) fighter. Three of the four German crew survive the crash: pilot Leutnant Horst Schopis (Florian Lukas), Feldwebel Wolfgang Strunk (Stig Henrik Hoff) and Obergefreiter Josef Schwartz (David Kross). Unteroffizier Hauk did not survive the crash. Josef's arm is injured, but it does not appear serious. They then set off for the coast to rejoin the fighting. When a snowstorm develops, they lose their supplies and encounter a hunter's cabin. Two British airmen from the other downed aircraft, Capt. Charles P. Davenport (Lachlan Nieboer) and his air gunner Robert Smith (Rupert Grint), are heard approaching the cabin. The Germans allow them in the cabin, but as prisoners of war. Horst divides the room roughly in half and explains the British must not cross the line without permission. The only food found is a small amount of oatmeal, which the Germans share equally. The Germans treat them fairly, but clearly both groups make no secrets of their contempt for the other; Smith in particular is antagonistic.

With little firewood, they begin chopping up things in the cabin to use. Horst takes Davenport's lighter, which Davenport objects to greatly as it was a gift from his father. Horst promises it will be returned when this is over. The following morning, an attempt to set out for help is abandoned when they start to get separated by the snowstorm, as the weather is clearly too rough.

After returning to the cabin, Smith sees an opportunity and grabs Josef's gun, putting it to Josef's head and forcing the other two to hand over their weapons. The next day, Smith and Strunk go out, hoping to spot some reindeer Smith had seen earlier. They only find (and Smith shoots) a rabbit instead.

Back at the cabin, Davenport orders Horst to chop down what is the main support beam in the middle of the cabin for firewood, despite Horst's objections. Immediately the roof begins to cave in, stopped just in the nick of time by Horst and Davenport standing on two small tables and holding up the roof. Horst takes advantage and takes Davenport's gun. When Smith and Strunk get back, there is a standoff and both sides agree to a "cease fire" until they can get to safety. They put all of the guns in a box. At this point, tensions have eased as the men get to know each other and realize they must work together to survive. This is aided greatly by Strunk accidentally uncovering a box under the floorboards with supplies, including dried meat and several bottles of alcohol.

Josef's arm becomes infected with gangrene and the men realized they must cut it off for him to survive. They get him drunk and cut off the arm with an axe, saving his life. At this point, the men have become friends, spending the night drinking and talking about each other's lives.

The next day, Smith and Strunk go out on skis found in the cabin to get to a hill and look for the best route to travel. Meanwhile, in a nearby military camp, a Norwegian scout reports that the downed German aircraft has been located and a small party of men is dispatched to look for the German airmen. When they encounter Smith and Strunk skiing back downhill towards the cabin, a Norwegian sniper fatally shoots Strunk and they capture Smith. The rest of the men are also captured.

Back at the military camp, a Norwegian officer interrogates the Britons, perceiving them as collaborators with the Germans. Horst then walks in and explains he wants to return Davenport's lighter, which he does. Davenport cannot bring himself to look at Horst as Horst places it on the table. The Norwegian officer then threatens to report Davenport and Smith to his superiors, saying that eventually the report would reach their British superiors. Davenport finally snaps, insulting the officer and telling him they were simply trying to survive.

Horst and Josef are seen being taken away in a canoe, apparently to be shipped to a prison camp. Davenport and Smith walk to the edge of the dock, where Davenport and Horst exchange a glance.

The epilogue credits state that eventually, Horst and Schwartz become prisoners of war in Canada. Smith and Davenport are returned to combat action and are shot down in their very next flight, during which Smith is killed. In 1977, Horst gets a call in his Munich home. It is Davenport, who invites Horst to London, where the former enemies meet as friends.

Cast
The main cast for the film includes:

 Stig Henrik Hoff as Feldwebel Wolfgang Strunk, portraying the real life Karl-Heinz Strunk
 David Kross as Obergefreiter Josef Schwartz, portraying the real life Josef Auchthor
 Florian Lukas as Leutnant Horst Schopis, portraying the same person in real life
 Lachlan Nieboer as Captain Charles P. Davenport, portraying the real life Captain R.T. Partridge
 Rupert Grint as Gunner Robert Smith, portraying the real life Lieutenant R.S. Bostock
 Kim Haugen as Second Lieutenant Bjørn Gustavsen (Norwegian ski patrol)
 Knut Joner as Private Harald Gustavsen (Norwegian ski patrol)
 Morten Faldaas as Terje (Norwegian ski patrol)
 Sondre Krogtoft Larsen as Kjell (Norwegian ski patrol)

Production
Although a realistic mock-up of a Heinkel He 111 bomber is used, nearly all of the production is set in a cabin with only occasional exterior scenes, prompting one reviewer to note that the film was more like a play. Filming began 28 March 2011 with three weeks of shooting in Grotli, Norway, near where the actual events occurred, with some scenes being shot in Trollhättan and Brålanda, Sweden. The finished film was released in March 2012.

Historical accuracy

Actual events

The film account is loosely based on historical events, although the British characters' names are changed. Captain R.T. Partridge is renamed Charles P. Davenport and Lieutenant R.S. Bostock became Robert Smith. The German characters' names bear more resemblance names of their real-life counterparts. Three British Royal Navy Blackburn Skuas operating from  attacked the Heinkel He 111 and knocked out the Germans' port engine. The German aircraft crashed 1,000 meters above sea level in a remote mountain area, miles from any major road. The German tail gunner Hans Hauck was dead when the bomber crashed.

Captain R.T. Partridge, squadron leader of the 800 Naval Air Squadron, Fleet Air Arm, experienced a failing engine in his Skua and glided down to land on a frozen lake. He had seen a small hut nearby and he and his radio operator, Lieutenant Bostock, hiked through heavy snow to the deserted reindeer hunters' cabin. A few minutes later, they were alerted by a whistle and saw the three survivors of the German Heinkel armed with pistols and knives. Speaking broken German and English, the British managed to persuade the Germans that they were the crew of a Vickers Wellington bomber, rather than the fighter that had shot them down. The Germans believed that they had been shot down by a Supermarine Spitfire.
 
In Luftkampfgegner wurden Freunde ("Air combat opponents became friends"), Horst Schopis wrote in his memoirs:

The two German survivors—Hauptmann Schopis and mechanic Joseph Auchtor—were taken over the mountains to Stryn as prisoners. Later they were sent to Britain and on to a prison camp in Canada, where they remained until 1947. The German tail gunner Hans Hauck was given a memorial stone which still stands near the Grotli Hotel. Strunk was initially buried in Skjåk cemetery, then later transferred to the war cemetery in Trondheim.

The British had some difficulty in convincing the Norwegians of their nationality until they showed the tailor's label on their uniforms and found a British half-crown coin. By sheer coincidence the commander of the Norwegian patrol turned out to be a brother-in-law of a friend of Captain Partridge. The two freed British airmen hiked into Ålesund, which was being defended by Royal Marines under heavy Luftwaffe bombing. As the destroyer scheduled to evacuate the British force failed to arrive, they commandeered a car and drove to the port of Åndalsnes, where they were eventually returned to the United Kingdom by the cruiser .

Captain Partridge and Lieutenant Bostock took part in the attempt to sink the German battleship  on 13 June 1940. Partridge was shot down near Stallvik in the Trondheimsfjord and captured by German troops. Lieutenant Bostock was killed in another Blackburn Skua on the same raid.

Both the German pilot Horst Schopis and the British pilot R.T. Partridge wrote books about their experiences before, during and after the war, entitled Luftkampfgegner wurden Freunde and Operation Skua.

In 1974, the original L2940 was recovered from Breidalsvatnet lake near Grotli in Skjåk municipality and the wreck is on display at the Fleet Air Arm Museum in Yeovilton. The original Heinkel wreck remains in the mountains at Grotli around 1,000 metres above sea level, left untouched in the snow.

In 1974 and 2004, Horst Schopis visited Grotli, but died in 2011 at 99 years of age, one year before the film's release. British captain R.T. Partridge visited Grotli in 1974 and died in 1990.

Release and reception
Into the White premiered at the Filmfest Oslo in March 2012 and was subsequently widely released in Norway where it grossed $636,469. In the US, the film had a limited release in select theatres.

Critical reviews were mixed, with some reviewers noting that the atmosphere and setting dominated to the detriment of the plot. Neil Lumbard  in his review for DVD Talk, commented: "The entirety of the film revolves around a somewhat simplistic plot element, which is based on actual historical events, but doesn't engage much beyond the central concept of the film ... The film is slow paced and for some audience members this is an obvious detriment."

, the film has an approval rating of 7.1 out of 10 at IMDb and has a rating of 45% at Rotten Tomatoes.

Årets lyddesign, Nikolai Linck and Andreas Kongsgaard were nominated for an Amanda Award for Best Sound Design for their work on Into the White.

Home media
Into the White was released on DVD and Blu-ray on 28 August 2012 in Norway.

References
Notes

Bibliography

 Partridge, Major R.T., DSO, RM. Operation Skua. Ilchester, Somerset, UK: Society of the Friends of the Fleet Air Arm Museum, RNAS Yeovilton, 1983. .

External links
 

2012 films
Films directed by Petter Næss
Films set in Norway
Films shot in Norway
Films shot in Sweden
British aviation films
Western Front of World War II films
World War II aviation films
World War II films based on actual events
2010s English-language films
English-language Norwegian films
English-language Swedish films
2010s German-language films
2010s Norwegian-language films
2010s survival films
Scanbox Entertainment films
2012 multilingual films
Norwegian multilingual films
Swedish multilingual films
Films produced by Peter Aalbæk Jensen
2010s British films